The 1908 Boston Red Sox season was the eighth season for the Major League Baseball franchise previously known as the Boston Americans. The Red Sox finished fifth in the American League (AL) with a record of 75 wins and 79 losses,  games behind the Detroit Tigers. The team played its home games at Huntington Avenue Grounds.

Regular season 
Prior to the regular season, the team held spring training in Little Rock, Arkansas.
 April 14: The regular season opens with a 3–1 home win over the Washington Senators.
 May 18: The team's longest losing streak of the season, seven games, ends with a home win over the Cleveland Naps.
 May 28: The team's longest winning streak of the season, five games, ends with a home loss to the Chicago White Sox.
 May 31: Jesse Tannehill was traded by the Red Sox to the Washington Senators for Casey Patten.
 June 30: Cy Young throws a no-hitter against the New York Highlanders at Hilltop Park in New York City; at the plate, Young has three hits and four RBIs.
 August 6: In their longest game of the season, the Americans lose to the White Sox, 2–1 in 13 innings at South Side Park in Chicago.
 August 27: Deacon McGuire manages his final games for the team, losing both ends of a doubleheader to the St. Louis Browns, dropping the team's record to 53–62.
 August 28: Fred Lake manages his first game, a 3–1 win over St. Louis. Under Lake, the team goes 22–17 through the end of the season.
 September 18: The franchise is no-hit for the first time in its history, by Bob Rhoads of Cleveland in a road game played at League Park.
 October 5: The regular season ends with home doubleheader against the Philadelphia Athletics; Boston wins the first game, 10–1, then loses the second game, 5–3 in eight innings.

Statistical leaders
The offense was led by Doc Gessler who had 63 RBIs, three home runs, and a .308 batting average. The pitching staff was led by Cy Young, who made 36 appearances (33 starts) and pitched 30 complete games with a 21–11 record and 1.26 ERA, while striking out 150 in 299 innings. Cy Morgan had a 14–13 record with 2.46 ERA in 30 games (26 starts). Smoky Joe Wood, who would go on to win 34 games in 1912, made his major league debut on August 24.

Season standings 

The team had one game end in a tie; September 28 at Chicago White Sox. Tie games are not counted in league standings, but player statistics during tie games are counted.

Record vs. opponents

Opening Day lineup 

Source:

Roster

Player stats

Batting

Starters by position 
Note: Pos = Position; G = Games played; AB = At bats; H = Hits; Avg. = Batting average; HR = Home runs; RBI = Runs batted in

Other batters 
Note: G = Games played; AB = At bats; H = Hits; Avg. = Batting average; HR = Home runs; RBI = Runs batted in

Pitching

Starting pitchers 
Note: G = Games pitched; IP = Innings pitched; W = Wins; L = Losses; ERA = Earned run average; SO = Strikeouts

Other pitchers 
Note: G = Games pitched; IP = Innings pitched; W = Wins; L = Losses; ERA = Earned run average; SO = Strikeouts

Relief pitchers 
Note: G = Games pitched; W = Wins; L = Losses; SV = Saves; ERA = Earned run average; SO = Strikeouts

References

Further reading

External links 
1908 Boston Red Sox team page at Baseball Reference
1908 Boston Red Sox season at baseball-almanac.com

Boston Red Sox seasons
Boston Red Sox
Boston Red Sox
1900s in Boston